The Latter-day Saints’ Millennial Star (usually shortened to Millennial Star) was the longest continuously published periodical of the Church of Jesus Christ of Latter-day Saints (LDS Church), and was printed in England from 1840 until 1970, when it was replaced by the church-wide Ensign. It was primarily aimed at British Latter-day Saints.

History
The first issue of the Millennial Star was published in Manchester, England, in May 1840, with Latter Day Saint Apostle Parley P. Pratt as editor and W. R. Thomas as printer. First mention of the newspaper being sold in Liverpool appeared in March 1842, and printing was officially moved to Liverpool with the April 1842 issue. Pratt was eventually replaced as editor by Thomas Ward. When Ward left England, Orson Hyde, who was then serving as Mission president in the area, became the editor. After that point, editing and supervision of the Star fell to the subsequent mission presidents of the church's European Mission, which was based in England.

When Orson Pratt was called as mission president in 1848, he also became the editor and publisher of the Millennial Star. In his first issue as editor, he also printed an address to the members and missionaries of the church.

Although the Star began as a monthly periodical, over the course of its 130-year history, it became a semi-monthly and then weekly paper.

Due to the Priesthood Correlation Program of the LDS Church, which sought to encourage uniformity and extend control over printed materials, the Millennial Star was replaced by Ensign at the end of 1970.

Editors
The following is a list of the editors of the Millennial Star with the time period where they were listed as the editor in the magazine. There are two periods in the 1960s where no editor identification appeared in the issues.
 Parley P. Pratt: May 1840 – October 1842
 Thomas Ward: November 1842 – 1 October 1846
 Orson Hyde: 15 October 1846 – 15 January 1847
 Orson Spencer: 1 February 1847 – 1 August 1848
 Orson Pratt: 15 August 1848 – 15 December 1850
 Franklin D. Richards: 1 January 1851 – 1 May 1852
 Samuel W. Richards: 8 May 1852 – 24 June 1854
 Franklin D. Richards (2nd term): 1 July 1854 – 2 August 1856
 Orson Pratt (2nd term): 9 August 1856 – 24 October 1857
 Samuel W. Richards (2nd term): 31 October 1857 – 6 March 1858
 Asa Calkin: 13 March 1858 – 12 May 1860
 N. V. Jones: 19 May 1860 – 11 August 1860
 Amasa Lyman: 18 August 1860 – 22 December 1860
 George Q. Cannon: 5 January 1861 – 27 August 1864
 Daniel H. Wells: 3 September 1864 – 2 September 1865
 Brigham Young Jr.: 9 September 1865 – 29 June 1867
 Franklin D. Richards (3rd term): 6 July 1867 – 12 September 1868
 Albert Carrington: 19 September 1868 – 14 June 1870
 Horace S. Eldredge: 21 June 1870 – 6 June 1871
 Albert Carrington (2nd term): 13 June 1871 – 21 October 1873
 Lester J. Herrick: 28 October 1873– 17 March 1874
 Joseph F. Smith: 24 March 1874 – 1 July 1878
 William Budge: 8 July 1878 – 1 November 1880
 Albert Carrington (3rd term): 8 November 1880 – 20 November 1882
 John Henry Smith: 27 November 1882 – 26 January 1885
 Daniel H. Wells (2nd term): 2 February 1885 – 14 February 1887
 George Teasdale: 21 February 1887 – 29 September 1890
 Brigham Young Jr. (2nd term): 6 October 1890 – 12 June 1893
 Anthon H. Lund: 19 June 1893 – 23 July 1896
 Rulon S. Wells: 30 July 1896 – 8 December 1898
 Platte D. Lyman: 15 December 1898 – 30 May 1901
 Francis M. Lyman: 6 June 1901 – 31 December 1903
 Heber J. Grant: 7 January 1904 – 29 November 1906
 Charles W. Penrose: 6 December 1906 – 9 June 1910
 Rudger Clawson: 16 June 1910 – 25 September 1913
 Hyrum M. Smith: 2 October 1913 – 31 August 1916
 George F. Richards: 7 September 1916 – 3 July 1919
 George Albert Smith: 10 July 1919 – 30 June 1921
 Orson F. Whitney: 7 July 1921 – 16 November 1922
 David O. McKay: 23 November 1922 – 25 December 1924
 James E. Talmage: 1 January 1925 – 22 December 1927
 John A. Widtsoe: 5 January 1928 – 28 September 1933
 Joseph F. Merrill: 5 October 1933 – 24 September 1936
 Richard R. Lyman: 1 October 1936 – 6 October 1938
 Hugh B. Brown: 13 October 1938 – 9 May 1940
 James P. Hill: 16 May 1940 – 31 December 1942
 Andre K. Anastasiou: (January?) 4 February 1943 – April 1944
 Hugh B. Brown (2nd term): May 1944 – June 1946
 Selvoy J. Boyer: July 1946 – February 1950
 Stayner Richards: March 1950 – July 1952
 A. Hamer Reiser: August 1952 – November 1955
 Clifton G. M. Kerr: December 1955 – October 1958
 T. Bowring Woodbury: November 1958 – June 1961
 N. Eldon Tanner: July 1961 – February 1963
 Mark E. Peterson: March 1963 – April 1963
 None Listed: May 1963 – February 1967
 Douglas D. Palmer: March 1967 – July 1967
 None Listed: August 1967 – November 1967
 Monitor C. Noyce: December 1967 – October 1969
 David Boulton: November 1969 – December 1970

See also

List of Latter Day Saint periodicals
John Lyon (poet)

Notes

References

External links
Millennial Star (PDF scans) Volumes 1–62, 1840–1900, L. Tom Perry Special Collections, Harold B. Lee Library, Brigham Young University
Millennial Star (scans) Volumes 63–132, 1901–1970, Church History Library and Internet Archives.

1840 in Christianity
Defunct newspapers published in the United Kingdom
Church of Christ (Latter Day Saints) periodicals
Publications disestablished in 1970
Newspapers established in 1840
The Church of Jesus Christ of Latter-day Saints in the United Kingdom